Anton Wiedemann (December 30, 1911 – November 6, 1953) was a German ice hockey player who competed for the German national team at the 1936 Winter Olympics in Garmisch-Partenkirchen. He played club hockey for EV Füssen.

References

1911 births
1953 deaths
German ice hockey centres
Ice hockey players at the 1936 Winter Olympics
Olympic ice hockey players of Germany
Sportspeople from Füssen